Modicogryllus is the type genus of crickets in the tribe Modicogryllini.  
Species have been recorded from: Europe, Africa, the middle East, temperate and tropical Asia through to Australia and western Pacific islands.

Species 
The Orthoptera Species File includes:

subgenus Amodicogryllus Gorochov, 1996
 Modicogryllus pseudocyprius Gorochov, 1996
subgenus Modicogryllus Chopard, 1961
 Modicogryllus abrictos Otte, 2007
 Modicogryllus algirius (Saussure, 1877)
 Modicogryllus alluaudi (Chopard, 1932)
 Modicogryllus amani Otte & Cade, 1984
 Modicogryllus angustulus (Walker, 1871)
 Modicogryllus aterrimus Chopard, 1963
 Modicogryllus badius Gorochov, 1988
 Modicogryllus beibienkoi (Chopard, 1938)
 Modicogryllus brincki (Chopard, 1955)
 Modicogryllus buehleri (Chopard, 1954)
 Modicogryllus castaneus (Chopard, 1928)
 Modicogryllus chopardi Bhowmik, 1971
 Modicogryllus clarellus (Saussure, 1877)
 Modicogryllus concisus (Walker, 1869)
 Modicogryllus confirmatus (Walker, 1859)
 Modicogryllus conjunctus (Stål, 1861)
 Modicogryllus consobrinus (Saussure, 1877)
 Modicogryllus conspersus (Schaum, 1853) - type species (as Gryllus conspersus Schaum, locality Mozambique)
 Modicogryllus cyprius (Saussure, 1877)
 Modicogryllus debilis (Saussure, 1877)
 Modicogryllus densinervis (Chopard, 1934)
 Modicogryllus dewhursti Otte & Cade, 1984
 Modicogryllus elgonensis (Chopard, 1938)
 Modicogryllus extraneus (Saussure, 1877)
 Modicogryllus facialis (Walker, 1871)
 Modicogryllus flavus (Chopard, 1936)
 Modicogryllus frontalis (Fieber, 1844)
 Modicogryllus garriens Otte & Cade, 1984
 Modicogryllus guanchicus (Krauss, 1892)
 Modicogryllus imbecillus (Saussure, 1877)
 Modicogryllus jagoi Otte & Cade, 1984
 Modicogryllus kenyensis Otte & Cade, 1984
 Modicogryllus kirschii (Saussure, 1877)
 Modicogryllus kivuensis (Chopard, 1939)
 Modicogryllus laticeps (Chopard, 1939)
 Modicogryllus lefevrei (Chopard, 1938)
 Modicogryllus luteus (Karny, 1907)
 Modicogryllus maliensis Otte & Cade, 1984
 Modicogryllus massaicus (Sjöstedt, 1910)
 Modicogryllus meruensis Otte & Cade, 1984
 Modicogryllus minimus (Chopard, 1928)
 Modicogryllus minutus (Chopard, 1954)
 Modicogryllus miser (Walker, 1869)
 Modicogryllus mombasae Otte & Cade, 1984
 Modicogryllus mulanje Otte, 1987
 Modicogryllus nandi Otte & Cowper, 2007
 Modicogryllus ngamius Otte, Toms & Cade, 1988
 Modicogryllus nitidus (Chopard, 1925)
 Modicogryllus pafuri Otte, Toms & Cade, 1988
 Modicogryllus pallipalpis (Tarbinsky, 1940)
 Modicogryllus pallipes (Chopard, 1925)
 Modicogryllus parilis Otte & Cade, 1984
 Modicogryllus perplexus Otte & Cade, 1984
 Modicogryllus regulus (King, 1826)
 Modicogryllus rehni Chopard, 1961
 Modicogryllus rotundipennis (Chopard, 1938)
 Modicogryllus segnis Otte & Cade, 1984
 Modicogryllus semiobscurus (Chopard, 1961)
 Modicogryllus serengetensis Otte & Cade, 1984
 Modicogryllus signifrons (Walker, 1869)
 Modicogryllus signipes (Walker, 1871)
 Modicogryllus smolus Gorochov, 1988
 Modicogryllus syriacus (Bolívar, 1893)
 Modicogryllus tikaderi Bhowmik, 1985
 Modicogryllus tripunctatus (Werner, 1908)
 Modicogryllus truncatus (Tarbinsky, 1940)
 Modicogryllus ullus Gorochov, 1988
 Modicogryllus uncinatus (Chopard, 1938)
 Modicogryllus vaginalis (Saussure, 1877)
 Modicogryllus vaturu Otte & Cowper, 2007
 Modicogryllus vicinus (Chopard, 1938)
 Modicogryllus vitreus Roy, 1971
 Modicogryllus vittatifrons (Chopard, 1962)
 Modicogryllus volivoli Otte & Cowper, 2007
 Modicogryllus walkeri Chopard, 1961
 Modicogryllus zinzilulans Otte & Cade, 1984
 Modicogryllus zolotarewskyi (Chopard, 1954)
subgenus Promodicogryllus Gorochov, 1986
 Modicogryllus bucharicus (Bey-Bienko, 1933)
 Modicogryllus ehsani Chopard, 1961

References

External links
 

Ensifera genera
crickets
Orthoptera of Asia
Orthoptera of Africa
Orthoptera of Europe